Mark A. Kuhn (born September 10, 1950 in Charles City, Iowa) is an American grain farmer and politician. He was the Iowa State Representative for the 14th District and served in the Iowa House of Representatives from 1999 through 2011.

Early life and education
Kuhn is the son of Max Kuhn, a farmer, and Helen, a school teacher.
Kuhn grew up on his family's farm and graduated from Charles City High School in 1968. He received his BS in history and his teaching certificate from Iowa State University. After graduating college, Kuhn moved back home to work on the family farm.

Career
Kuhn has worked on the Kuhn family grain farm for 34 years. He also worked as a substitute teacher for fifteen years.

In 1999 he was elected the Iowa State Representative for the 14th District.
He was re-elected in 2006 with 8,154 votes (75%), defeating Independent opponent Darwin J. Rieman.

In the Iowa House of Representatives Kuhn served on the Agriculture committee; the Environmental Protection committee; Rebuild Iowa/Disaster Recovery Committee; the Public Safety committee; and the Appropriations committee, where he was the vice chair. He also chaired the Agriculture and Natural Resources Appropriations Subcommittee.

In 2010 Kuhn decided to retire from the Iowa House and not run in the 2010 election but run for an open seat on the Floyd County Board of Supervisors instead. As of July 2017 he is on the Floyd County Board of Supervisors and advocates for more restrictive manure management practices, a reform of the "Master Matrix", in order to improve Iowa´s water quality.

Personal life
Kuhn is married to his wife Denise and together they have two sons: Mason and Alex. They live just outside Charles City, Iowa, on his farm, where he maintains a one-court tennis facility dubbed the All Iowa Lawn Tennis Club, which was featured in an issue of TENNIS Magazine. He owns the first wind turbine commissioned during President Obama’s administration.

Organizations
Kuhn is or has been a member of the following organizations:
 Trinity United Methodist Church
 Foster Grandparents Advisory Committee
 Free Our Communities of Unhealthy Substances Council
 Mental Health Center of North Iowa
 Second Judicial District Department of Correctional Services
 Floyd County Agricultural Development Authority
 Charles City Area Development Corporation.
 Northern Prairie Regional Economic Development Corporation
 Iowa’s Center for Agricultural Safety and Health Advisory Committee
 Floyd County Water Quality Coordinating Committee

References

External links
 
 Mark Kuhn State Representative official constituency site
 
 Financial information (state office) at the National Institute for Money in State Politics

Democratic Party members of the Iowa House of Representatives
Living people
1950 births
Iowa State University alumni
People from Charles City, Iowa